Frank James Malzone (February 28, 1930 – December 29, 2015) was a Major League Baseball third baseman who played for the Boston Red Sox (1955–65) and California Angels (1966).

Early years
Frank was signed as a free agent out of Samuel Gompers High School by the Boston Red Sox in 1947.

Career
Malzone spent 11 seasons with Boston and is among the all-time Red Sox leaders in several categories. He batted .276 with 131 home runs and 716 runs batted in in 1359 games. A free agent at the end of 1965, he finished up with the Angels playing 82 games in 1966.

Malzone made his Boston debut in 1955, going 6-for-10 in a doubleheader against Baltimore. In 1957, in his first full season with the Red Sox, he had a career-high 103 RBI and tied an American League record for a third baseman with 10 assists in a game. He became the first player to lead the league at his position in games played, putouts, errors, assists, double plays and fielding percentage.

Malzone led the league with 627 at-bats and hit a career-high .295 in 1958. Through 1961, he tied a record by leading AL third basemen in double plays over five straight seasons, enjoying his best season in 1962, batting .283 with 21 home runs and 95 RBI. He was an  All-Star eight times (1957, 1958, 1959* ,1960* ,1963–64 - * - MLB had All-Star games twice a season from 1959 to 1962) and won three straight Gold Glove Awards (1957–59), including the first Gold Glove for a third baseman in MLB history. He was the last American League third baseman to win a Gold Glove prior to Brooks Robinson's 16-year run.

In his career Malzone compiled a record of .274 BA, 133 home runs, 728 RBI, 647 runs, 239 doubles, 21 triples, and 14 stolen bases in 1,441 games. After 35 years as a Boston scout, Malzone served as a player development consultant for the Red Sox.

Malzone was inducted into the Boston Red Sox Hall of Fame in its inaugural Class of 1995.

He died on December 29, 2015.

See also
List of Gold Glove Award winners at third base

References

External links

Frank Malzone at Baseballbiography.com

1930 births
2015 deaths
American League All-Stars
American people of Italian descent
Boston Red Sox players
Boston Red Sox scouts
California Angels players
Gold Glove Award winners
Major League Baseball third basemen
Sportspeople from Needham, Massachusetts
Sportspeople from the Bronx
Baseball players from New York City